Steven Andrew Oleksy (born February 4, 1986) is an American professional ice hockey defenseman who is currently playing for Orlando Solar Bears in the ECHL. He has formerly played in National Hockey League (NHL) with the Washington Capitals and Pittsburgh Penguins.

Early life
Oleksy was born in Chesterfield Township, Michigan. He attended L'Anse Creuse High School - North and graduated in 2004. He has one brother, Daniel, who played hockey at Oakland University. During high school Oleksy was a four-year letter winner at L'Anse Creuse High School-North. He went on to play one year of NJCAA college baseball at Macomb Community College. His jersey number was retired at L'Anse Creuse High School North on May 13, 2014.

Playing career
Oleksy grew up playing hockey around the metro Detroit area. He played for the Troy Sting AA team, before moving on to play junior hockey in the Central States Hockey League with the Michigan Metro Jets. He then went on to play in the NAHL with the Traverse City North Stars. Oleksy then won a scholarship at Lake Superior State University where he played three seasons of NCAA Division I college hockey with the Lake Superior State Lakers men's ice hockey team. Following his graduation, Oleksy turned professional to join the Las Vegas Wranglers for two games at the end of their 2008–09 ECHL season.

After starting the 2011–12 season with the Idaho Steelheads  of the ECHL for a third season, Oleksy joined the Bridgeport Sound Tigers on loan before signing an extension for the remainder of the year on February 23, 2012.

Proving a solid addition to the Sound Tigers defense, Oleksy was signed as a free agent for the following 2012–13 season in the AHL with the Hershey Bears on July 2, 2012. After 55 games with the Bears and ranking third among AHL defensemen in penalty minutes, Oleksy was signed to his first NHL deal with the Bears' affiliate, the Washington Capitals, on a three-year two-way contract on March 4, 2013. He was then immediately recalled to the Capitals. In his NHL debut, he registered an assist for the Capitals in a 4–3 comeback victory over the Boston Bruins on March 5.
 
On July 1, 2015, Oleksy left the Capitals as a free agent and signed a one-year, two-way contract with the Pittsburgh Penguins. On June 12, 2016 Oleksy won the Stanley Cup as a member of the Penguins. Following the game he drank his first ever sip of alcohol out of it.

In the 2016–17 season, Oleksy started a second season in Scranton before he returned to NHL action, appearing in 11 games with Pittsburgh for 1 assist. On March 1, 2017, Oleksy was included in a trade by the Penguins alongside Eric Fehr and a fourth-round pick in 2017, to the Toronto Maple Leafs in exchange for Frank Corrado. He was directly assigned to AHL affiliate, the Toronto Marlies.

On July 2, 2017, Oleksy secured a two-year, one-way contract as a free agent with the Anaheim Ducks. During the second year of his contract in the 2018–19 season, while with the Ducks AHL affiliate, the San Diego Gulls, Oleksy was traded for a second time to the Toronto Maple Leafs in exchange for Adam Cracknell on December 10, 2018. He appeared in a further 23 regular season games with the Marlies posting 2 goals and 5 points.

With his NHL contract concluded, Oleksy as a free agent from the Maple Leafs went unsigned over the summer. On September 27, 2019, he agreed to return to former AHL club the Wilkes-Barre/Scranton Penguins, signing an initial professional tryout contract to begin the 2019–20 season. Oleksy was released from his tryout before appearing in a game with the Penguins and was signed to an ECHL contract with the Toledo Walleye on October 15, 2019. Oleksy made 36 appearances in his return with the Walleye before leaving North America to sign a contract in Europe for the remainder of the season with Austrian club, EHC Black Wings Linz of the EBEL, on February 7, 2020.
In Summer 2021 he re-signed an ECHL contract with the Toledo Walleye before being traded to the Orlando Solar Bears.

Career statistics

InLine Hockey
Oleksy played with Team USA at the 2008 and 2009 IIHF Men's InLine Hockey World Championships.

References

External links
 

1986 births
Living people
American men's ice hockey defensemen
EHC Black Wings Linz players
Bridgeport Sound Tigers players
Hershey Bears players
Ice hockey players from Michigan
Idaho Steelheads (ECHL) players
Lake Erie Monsters players
Lake Superior State Lakers men's ice hockey players
Las Vegas Wranglers players
People from Macomb County, Michigan
Pittsburgh Penguins players
Port Huron Icehawks players
San Diego Gulls (AHL) players
Sportspeople from Metro Detroit
Toledo Walleye players
Toronto Marlies players
Undrafted National Hockey League players
Washington Capitals players
Wilkes-Barre/Scranton Penguins players